Inaya Folarin Iman (born November 1996) is a British journalist, commentator, and television presenter who has presented for GB News. She is also the director and founder of the Equiano Project (named after abolitionist Olaudah Equiano), which describes itself as "a debate, discussion and ideas forum" that "focus[es] on race, culture and politics". In September 2021, she was appointed as a trustee for the National Portrait Gallery in London.

Iman was signed by GB News, a news channel that began broadcasting in June 2021. On the channel, she hosted a weekly culture and politics show, The Discussion, which aired every Sunday until May 2022.

Political views
A supporter of Britain's withdrawal from the EU and former Brexit Party candidate, Iman was a member of the Free Speech Union and was a  former project manager for Index on Censorship.

Iman has criticised Black Lives Matter, seeing the movement as an "opportunistic pretext for an outpouring of self-righteous rage". Following the murder of George Floyd, Iman criticised comparisons between black people's experiences in the United Kingdom and the United States. Alongside Andrew Doyle, Claire Fox and others, she was co-signator of a letter in The Spectator which said that "activists, corporations and institutions seem to have seized the opportunity to exploit Floyd's death to promote an ideological agenda that threatens to undermine British race relations. ... We must oppose and expose the racial division being sown in the name of anti-racism." She has also called gestures such as "taking the knee" against racism as part of a culture war.

Writing for Spiked, she rejected the claims of BLM that Britain is a racist society, saying that in the UK, "racial equality is near achieved and so-called structural racism has been almost totally eradicated".

She has written for The Daily Telegraph, the Daily Mail, The Times, Spiked, Standpoint, BrexitCentral, gal-dem and the i. She has featured and made appearances on Politics Live, The Big Questions, Good Morning Britain, Sky News, Moral Maze, Vox and BBC Radio 5 Live.

Electoral record 

1 The Conservative Party suspended Amjad Bashir on 20 November 2019. He still appeared on ballot papers under the Conservative label, as nominations had closed by the time of the suspension.

References

1996 births
Living people
British political commentators
GB News newsreaders and journalists
Reform UK politicians
Black British women